Monster Slayer may refer to:

Literature
"Monster Slayer", a short story in the comic book anthology Avatar: The Last Airbender – The Lost Adventures
Monster Slayer, a Graphic Universe comic book based on Beowulf
Poesy the Monster Slayer, a comic book written by Cory Doctorow
Monster Slayer Online, a novel duology written by R.R. Virdi

Games
Monster Slayer, a Ranger archetype in the tabletop RPG Dungeons & Dragons
Garshasp: The Monster Slayer, a 2011 action-adventure computer game
The Witcher: Monster Slayer, a geolocation-based mobile role-playing game

Other uses
Nayenezgani, a character from the Navajo creation myth
Jack Brooks: Monster Slayer, a 2007 comedy horror film